The Montebello Islands, also rendered as the Monte Bello Islands, are an archipelago of around 174 small islands (about 92 of which are named) lying  north of Barrow Island and  off the Pilbara coast of north-western Australia. The islands form a marine conservation reserve of  administered by the Western Australian Department of Environment and Conservation. The islands were the site of three British atmospheric nuclear weapons tests in 1952 and 1956.

Description
They consist of limestone rock and sand. The rocky parts are dominated by Triodia hummock grassland with scattered shrubs, while the sandy areas support grasses, sedges and shrubs, mainly Acacia. Patches of mangroves grow in sheltered bays and channels of the archipelago, especially at Hermite Island. The climate is hot and arid with an annual average rainfall of about 320 mm.

Wildlife

Birds 
The islands have been identified by BirdLife International as an Important Bird Area (IBA) because they support over 1% of the world populations of fairy and roseate terns, and of sooty oystercatchers. Greater crested terns breed there irregularly, sometimes in large numbers. Other birds breeding on the islands include ospreys, white-bellied sea eagles, pied oystercatchers, Caspian terns and bridled terns. The islands support 12–15 breeding pairs of beach stone-curlews. Yellow white-eyes have been recorded.

Mammals 
Invasive feral cats and black rats have been eradicated from the islands, allowing endangered rufous hare-wallabies (mala) and Shark Bay mice to be translocated to the islands under the conservation management strategy for these threatened species. They are now common on many of the larger islands.

History
It is believed that the islands were visited by indigenous Australians until about 8248 BP, when a period of global warming and rising sea levels caused the Montebellos to become separated from the mainland, and forced abandonment.

The ship's factor Thomas Bright and 35 others sailed a longboat to the Montebello Islands and spent seven days ashore, before sailing the longboat to Bantam in Java. This was the first recorded shipwreck in Australian waters and the first extended stay in Australia by Europeans.

In 1801 Nicolas Baudin, leading a French Navy exploration expedition, named the island group after the Battle of Montebello of 1800, Hermite Island after Admiral Jean-Marthe-Adrien L'Hermite, and Trimouille Island after French general Louis II de la Trémoille. 

The islands were economically significant for pearl fishing from the end of the 19th century until the outbreak of the Second World War.

British nuclear weapons tests

The Montebello Islands were the site of three atmospheric nuclear weapon tests by the British military: one in 1952, and two in 1956.

HMS Plym, moored in Main Bay on Trimouille Island, was the site of Operation Hurricane, the first-ever atomic weapon tested by the United Kingdom, on 3 October 1952.

While subsequent British tests were conducted at sites on mainland Australia, in 1956 there were two land-sited tower-mounted tests, on Trimouille and Alpha Islands. The second of these, codenamed "Mosaic G2", was the largest nuclear explosion in Australia, with an official yield of 60 kilotons. Mosaic G2 was later described as an "exceptionally dirty explosion", whose fallout contaminated large areas of mainland Australia, as far away as the Queensland towns of Mount Isa, Julia Creek, Longreach and Rockhampton.

Islands

Of the smaller islands, the largest are:

 North-West Island
 Primrose Island
 Bluebell Island
 Alpha Island
 Crocus Island
 Campbell Island
 Delta Island
 Renewal Island
 Ah Chong Island

There are also 10 named groups of small islets, whose individual islands have not yet been named:

 Corkwood Islands
 Fig Islands
 Hakea Islands
 Jarrah Islands
 Jasmine Islands
 Karri Islands
 Marri Islands
 Minnieritchie Islands
 Mulga Islands
 Quandong Islands

References

Further reading
 Acaster, Ray (1995). "British nuclear testing at the Monte Bello Islands". Early Days Vol. 11, no. 1. pp. 66–80.
 Arnold, Lorna; and Smith, Mark (2006). Britain, Australia and the Bomb: The Nuclear Tests and Their Aftermath. Palgrave MacMillan. 
 Bird, Peter (1989). Operation Hurricane. Square One Publications: Worcester. (First published in 1953). 
 Burbidge, A. A. (1971). The Fauna and Flora of the Monte Bello Islands. Department of Fisheries and Fauna: Perth.
 Deegan, P. M. (1992). Monte Bello and Lowendal Islands: bibliography, summary report of marine resources. Dept. of Conservation and Land Management: Perth.
 Duyker, Edward (2006). François Péron: An Impetuous Life: Naturalist and Voyager. Miegunyah/MUP: Melbourne. 
 Fornasiero, Jean; Monteath, Peter; and West-Sooby, John (2004). Encountering Terra Australis: the Australian voyages of Nicholas Baudin and Matthew Flinders. Wakefield Press: Kent Town, South Australia. 
 Horner, Frank (1987). The French Reconnaissance: Baudin in Australia 1801–1803. Melbourne University Press: Melbourne. .
 Tuckfield, Trevor (1 August 1951). "The Monte Bello Islands". Walkabout, Vol. 17, No. 8. pp. 33–34.

External links

Video footage of the Operation Hurricane detonation on Trimouille Island in 1951
Nicolas Baudin's Scientific Expedition to the Terres Australes by Steve Reynolds – Marine Life Society of South Australia Inc.
Details of a feral cat eradication program on Hermite Island in 1999
Nuclear testing details

 
Important Bird Areas of Western Australia
Nuclear test sites in Australia
Protected areas of Western Australia